Indigo is the fourth studio album by American rock band Never Shout Never. It was released on November 13, 2012, by Loveway Records. The album features the band recording as a whole for the second time; the first being in Time Travel. A bonus track was made available through some media outlets and also on the limited edition cassette tape. The album debuted at number 194 on the Billboard 200.

Background

Recording
Christofer Ingle originally wanted to record every song with a different producer, all in different cities, to give each song a unique feel and its own style. The album would also include reworkings of "On The Brightside" and "Trouble."

For the recording of Indigo, Never Shout Never had recorded at Studio 2100 in Springfield, Missouri.

Release and promotion
Never Shout Never announced on February 8, 2012 that their then-titled Good Times would be released sometime in the summer of 2012. Ingle announced on Twitter that the album would be out by late fall. Ingle demoed the new songs through Loveway Records' Stickam page on June 4, 2012.

Promotional singles
Prior to the start of The Indigo Tour, Never Shout Never released three free unreleased acoustic tracks from their album through Alternative Press.

Touring
To promote Indigo, Never Shout Never embarked on a South American tour to promote the album early. The tour began in early November 2012 and consisted 6 shows. Ingle announced that he was getting the lineup together for the next tour, via Twitter on July 13, 2012. The Indigo Tour, the second tour to further promote the album, began in November 2012. The tour is composed of 22 show dates throughout North America. The tour was announced through the band's website on September 25, 2012.

Critical reception

Indigo has received generally positive reviews. Claire Sheridan of Alter The Press! states that "Christofer Drew is a storyteller, capturing his audience right up until the last resounding word like an author that keeps their readers hanging on until the end." Alternative Press' Evan Lucy wrote that "[the band] could have used an outside set of eats to make things a little more dynamic, reign in the more head-scratching moments and correct some mixing issues. So in the end, Indigo is just a new entry into Drew's discography, another example of the shape-shifting singer's musical nomadism." Alyssa McKinley of PropertyOfZack comments that "Never Shout Never have taken many pop infused influences to put a new spin on their music, yet again. While at certain points, it simply doesn't work, standout tracks make Indigo an entirely worthwhile listen. Diverse in ingredients but consistent in flavor, this record is a step in a great direction for the band. But then again, who knows if direction is something that has ever mattered in the career of Never Shout Never."

Track listing
Track listing according to Amazon.com.

Personnel
Never Shout Never
Christofer Drew Ingle – lead vocals, guitars, ukulele, programming, banjo, harmonica, keyboard
Taylor MacFee – bass, backing vocals
Hayden Kaiser – guitar, backing vocals, percussion

Production
David Beame – legal advisor
David Conway – management
Sha'an D'anthers – artwork
Kevin Deems – photography
Christofer Drew – artwork, composer, cover art, mixing
Dirk Hemsath – management
Patrick Maxwell – producer
Never Shout Never – composer, primary artist, producer
Jeff Smith – engineer, mastering, mixing, producer

Charts

Release history

References

2012 albums
Never Shout Never albums